Chiazzolino is an Italian surname. Notable people with the surname include:

Dario Chiazzolino (born 1985), Italian jazz guitarist and composer
Giacomo Chiazzolino (born 1986), Italian footballer

Italian-language surnames